Juha Harjula (20 June 1942 – 12 March 2020) was a Finnish basketball player. He competed in the men's tournament at the 1964 Summer Olympics.

References

External links
 

1942 births
2020 deaths
Finnish men's basketball players
Olympic basketball players of Finland
Basketball players at the 1964 Summer Olympics
Sportspeople from Helsinki